"Simply a Waltz" is a song by Édith Piaf, with music and lyrics by Norman Wallace. It was the only song Piaf never sang in French. In 1950 Piaf recorded “Simply a Waltz”, along with “La Vie en rose,” “Hymn to Love,” and “The Three Bells”  at Columbia's Paris studio. Piaf performed the song at a dinner for Dwight D. Eisenhower in 1952, a few months before he was elected president.

References

1950 songs
Édith Piaf songs
Songs with lyrics by Édith Piaf